The 2014 Southern Conference football season was the 93rd season of college football for the Southern Conference (SoCon) and formed a part of the 2014 NCAA Division I FCS football season.

It was the first season for two newcomers: the Mercer Bears, who previously played in the Pioneer Football League, and the VMI Keydets, who had an 80-year stint in the SoCon before joining the Big South Conference in 2003. The additions of Mercer and VMI, along with East Tennessee State, who is bringing back football in 2015, replaced the departure of Georgia Southern and Appalachian State who joined the Sun Belt Conference, as well as Elon who left for the Colonial Athletic Association.

Previous season
In 2013, both Appalachian State and Georgia Southern were ineligible for postseason play due to their transition to the FBS in 2014. Both schools had down years, each going 4–4 in conference play, with Georgia Southern posting a 7–4 overall mark to Appalachian State's 4–8. At the top of the conference was a three-way tie between Chattanooga, Samford, and Furman, who all posted 6–2 conference records. The three schools were declared co-champions, though only Samford and Furman were selected to participate in the FCS tournament.

Samford, who finished ranked #18 in the coaches poll, was defeated in the second round of the playoffs by Jacksonville State on the road, 55–14. Furman, ranked #22, beat South Carolina State in their opening round game in Orangeburg by a score of 30–20. They were knocked out the following week by North Dakota State, who went on to win their third straight national title.

Newcomer Mercer finished their tenure in the Pioneer League on a high note, going 10–2 and 6–2 in conference play, narrowly missing out on the playoffs. VMI was 2–10 in 2013, including a 1–4 mark in Big South play, beating Gardner–Webb.

Head coaches

Russ Huesman, Chattanooga – 6th year
Mike Houston, The Citadel – 1st year
Bruce Fowler, Furman – 4th year
Pat Sullivan, Samford – 7th year

Bobby Lamb, Mercer – 2nd year
Sparky Woods, VMI – 7th year
Mark Speir, Western Carolina – 3rd year
Mike Ayers, Wofford – 27th year

Preseason poll results
First place votes in parentheses

Rankings

Regular season

All times Eastern time.

Rankings reflect that of the Sports Network poll for that week.

Week One

Players of the week:

Week Two

Players of the week:

Week Three

Players of the week:

Week Four

Players of the week:

Week Five

Players of the week:

Week Six

Players of the week:

Week Seven

Players of the week:

Week Eight

Players of the week:

Week Nine

Players of the week:

Week Ten

Players of the week:

Week Eleven

Players of the week:

Week Twelve

Players of the week:

Week Thirteen

Players of the week:

Records against other conferences

FCS conferences

FBS conferences

Attendance

References